The 1950 Chicago Cubs season was the 79th season of the Chicago Cubs franchise, the 75th in the National League and the 35th at Wrigley Field. The Cubs finished seventh in the National League with a record of 64–89.

Offseason 
 October 29, 1949: Jim Fanning was signed as an amateur free agent by the Chicago Cubs.

Regular season

Season standings

Record vs. opponents

Notable transactions 
 April 1, 1950: Gene Baker was signed as an amateur free agent by the Cubs.
 June 29, 1950: Harry Chiti was signed as an amateur free agent by the Cubs.

Roster

Player stats

Batting

Starters by position 
Note: Pos = Position; G = Games played; AB = At bats; H = Hits; Avg. = Batting average; HR = Home runs; RBI = Runs batted in

Other batters 
Note: G = Games played; AB = At bats; H = Hits; Avg. = Batting average; HR = Home runs; RBI = Runs batted in

Pitching

Starting pitchers 
Note: G = Games pitched; IP = Innings pitched; W = Wins; L = Losses; ERA = Earned run average; SO = Strikeouts

Other pitchers 
Note: G = Games pitched; IP = Innings pitched; W = Wins; L = Losses; ERA = Earned run average; SO = Strikeouts

Relief pitchers 
Note: G = Games pitched; W = Wins; L = Losses; SV = Saves; ERA = Earned run average; SO = Strikeouts

Farm system 

LEAGUE CHAMPIONS: Nashville, Rock Hill, Sioux Falls

References

External links
1950 Chicago Cubs season at Baseball Reference

Chicago Cubs seasons
Chicago Cubs season
Chicago Cubs